Osvaldo José Virgil Pichardo (born May 17, 1932) is a former professional baseball player and coach who was the first Dominican to play in Major League Baseball. He was a utilityman who played in MLB between 1956 and 1969 for the New York / San Francisco Giants (1956–57, 1966, 1969), Detroit Tigers (1958; 1960–61), Kansas City Athletics (1961), Baltimore Orioles (1962), and Pittsburgh Pirates (1965). Basically a third baseman, Virgil played all positions except pitcher and center field.

Virgil's son, Ozzie Virgil Jr. was also a Major League player, a 2x All-Star catcher for the Philadelphia Phillies, Atlanta Braves, and Toronto Blue Jays.

Career
Virgil was born in Monte Cristi, Dominican Republic. His family emigrated to the United States when he was 13 and settled in The Bronx, where Virgil graduated from DeWitt Clinton High School.  He served in the United States Marines from 1950 to 1952, and began his 17-season professional playing career in 1953. 

On September 23, 1956, he became the first person from his native country to play in the Majors when he started for the Giants at third base against the Philadelphia Phillies. Twenty-one months later, on June 6, 1958, Virgil became the first player of African descent to take the field for the Tigers, again starting at third base, this time against the Washington Senators.

Charlie Metro, his manager on the 1960 Denver Bears, had this to say about him: "Ozzie Virgil Sr. was from the Dominican Republic.  He came to my ball club at Denver, and then Detroit picked him up.  He had a fantastic record for us.  Ozzie was hitting about .400, and in a part-time role.  I played him everywhere—third, second, outfield.  He had 77 hits and 55 runs batted in, and was batting .381, when they took him up to the big leagues.  I was crazy about him.  He did everything well.  Later, when I was putting together the Kansas City Royals, I was going to draft him as a player-coach out of the Giants organization, where he was with their Triple-A club, but I spoke up out loud.  Tom Sheehan, a scout and front office guy for the Giants, overheard me, so they put him on the big league club and protected him."

In a nine-season big-league career, Virgil posted a .231 batting average with 174 hits, 14 home runs and 73 RBI in 324 games played. After his playing career ended, Virgil spent 19 seasons as a coach for the Giants (1969–72; 1974–75); Montréal Expos (1976–81); San Diego Padres (1982–85); and Seattle Mariners (1986–88). From 1977 to 1988, he served as the third-base coach on the staff of Baseball Hall of Fame manager Dick Williams.  His son, catcher Ozzie Jr., played in all or parts of 11 MLB seasons (1980–90) and was a two-time National League All-Star.

Osvaldo Virgil National Airport serves the Monte Cristi Province, in the north of the Dominican Republic. This airport was opened in 2006 for tourism with flights from other Dominican airports.

See also
List of first black Major League Baseball players
List of second-generation Major League Baseball players
List of players from Dominican Republic in Major League Baseball

References

External links

1932 births
Living people
Águilas Cibaeñas players
Puerto Rican expatriate baseball players in the Dominican Republic
Baltimore Orioles players
Caribbean Series managers
Charleston Senators players
Dallas Eagles players
Danville Leafs players
Detroit Tigers players
DeWitt Clinton High School alumni
Dominican Republic expatriate baseball players in Canada
Dominican Republic expatriate baseball players in the United States
Kansas City Athletics players

Major League Baseball players from the Dominican Republic
Major League Baseball third base coaches
Major League Baseball third basemen
Minneapolis Millers (baseball) players
Montreal Expos coaches
New York Giants (NL) players
People from Monte Cristi Province
Phoenix Giants players
Pittsburgh Pirates players
Rochester Red Wings players
St. Cloud Rox players
San Diego Padres coaches
San Francisco Giants coaches
San Francisco Giants players
San Francisco Giants scouts
Seattle Mariners coaches
Toronto Maple Leafs (International League) players
United States Marines
Sportspeople from the Bronx
Baseball players from New York City